Jim Sotos was an American film director in the 1970s and 1980s.

Sotos directed the 1975 film, Forced Entry; the 1983 film, Sweet Sixteen; the 1985 film, Hot Moves; and the 1989 film, Beverly Hills Brats. He was also a producer and on other films such as Texas Lightning.

References

External links
 

Year of birth missing (living people)
Living people
American film directors
American film producers
Place of birth missing (living people)